Mamontovsky is a rural locality (a settlement) in Aleysky District of Altai Krai, Russia.

References

Notes

Sources

Rural localities in Aleysky District